Christian Guilbert (3 January 1928 – 20 August 2014) was a French rower. He competed at the 1948 Summer Olympics in London with the men's double sculls where they were eliminated in the semi-final.

References

1928 births
2014 deaths
French male rowers
Olympic rowers of France
Rowers at the 1948 Summer Olympics
Sportspeople from Val-de-Marne
European Rowing Championships medalists
20th-century French people